State Route 91 (SR 91) is a state highway in the northeastern portion of the U.S. state of Tennessee, in the area known as the Tri-Cities region. The route connects Johnson City with Damascus, Virginia via Elizabethton, Hunter, and Mountain City.

Route description

SR 91 begins at an intersection with US 11E/SR 34 in Johnson City. The first section of the road follows two one-way streets, namely Market Street (westbound traffic) and Main Street (eastbound traffic).  It has an interchange with I-26/US 19W/US 23 before continuing along East Main Street and Elizabethton Highway as it leaves the city.

In Elizabethton, it meets US 321/SR 67/SR 362, and runs concurrent with US 321 along West Elk Avenue and Broad Street through the city's downtown area. Along the way, it passes Sycamore Shoals State Historic Area. Farther into the city, the highway crosses the Doe River before reaching its US 19E/US 321/SR 67/SR 37 intersection. It then turns northward to run concurrent with these highways, crossing the Watauga River via the Gilbert Peters Bridge before splitting off again and continuing northeastward along Stony Creek Road.

In northeastern Elizabethton, SR 91 passes Elizabethton Municipal Airport and the Elizabethton campus of Northeast State Community College.  Beyond the community of Hunter, the highway enters the Cherokee National Forest as it continues northeastward through a broad valley between Holston Mountain to the north and the Iron Mountains to the south.  Northeast of the Buladeen area, the highway ascends to over  through a series of switchback curves as it passes over a cross ridge between Holston Mountain and the Irons, where it enters Johnson County.  It then descends into the secluded Shady Valley.

In Shady Valley, the route intersects US 421/SR 34/SR 133. US 421 continues northwestward to Bristol, while SR 133 continues northeastward toward Damascus, Virginia. SR 91 turns southeastward to run concurrent with US 421 and SR 34. The highway crosses the Iron Mountains at Sandy Gap, climbing to over  before descending again to the outskirts of Mountain City.

Near downtown Mountain City, SR 91 splits off from US 421/SR 34 to once again follow a northeastward track.  It continues through a series of gradual ascents and descents across rugged terrain before reaching Laurel Bloomery in the northeastern part of the county.  SR-91 meets its northern terminus at the Virginia state line, near Damascus, where the roadway continues as Virginia State Route 91 into Washington County, Virginia, and the Jefferson National Forest.

Major intersections

See also
 
 
 List of state routes in Tennessee

References

External links
 

091
Transportation in Washington County, Tennessee
Transportation in Carter County, Tennessee
Transportation in Johnson County, Tennessee
Johnson City, Tennessee